Popular Science Predictions Exchange (PPX) was an online virtual prediction market run as part of the Popular Science website. The application was designed by the same group behind the Hollywood Stock Exchange using their virtual specialist application. Users traded virtual currency, known as POP$, based on the likelihood of a certain event being realized by a given date. Stock prices would range between POP$0 and POP$100 and were intended to reflect the general confidence of the users about that event. A stock at price POP$95 would mean roughly that users believed there to be a 95% chance of the event happening. If an event was realized by the given date, the stock will pay out POP$100 per share. A stock that did not occur by the closing date was worth POP$0 per share.

On May 8, 2009, PopSci announced that the PPX exchange would close on May 31, 2009, almost two years after it first opened. At the time of the announcement, there were 33,339 registered users. The top 100 traders at the time of closing were listed in a hall of fame. Another news post on the site suggests that the site was planned to only have a two-year run.

General
Each user begun with POP$250000 which could have been invested in any of the available stocks. By taking a short survey, users were awarded an additional POP$10000. Each Monday, Wednesday and Friday a new IPO was introduced to the market. Following an IPO, users could buy or short shares of the stock based on their feelings of its practicality. To maintain fairness to new users, no user could own more than 1,000 shares of a particular stock at one time and no one could buy a particular stock for several hours after a new stock is introduced to give everyone a fair chance of purchasing it at its introductory POP$50 a share. The price of the stock was then used as an indicator of user confidence in that event and also as a way to increase one's net worth. As new information became available to the public, stocks prices were further refined as users moved to better their position on that stock.

Types of trading
There were four ways to trade. The first two were to buy and sell. When you bought an IPO, you were investing in the fact that the prediction of that IPO will come true. If you owned shares of that IPO when the predicted event occurs, you were awarded 100 POP$ per share. When you sold owned shares of an IPO, you were given the amount of POP$ that the IPO you sold was worth for each share you owned. The next two types of trading were shorting and covering. When you short a stock of an IPO, you are investing in the fact that the IPO will fail. If you own shorted shares of the IPO when the prediction fails, you no longer must pay back your original price. A stock shorted at POP$60, on a failed IPO would have been awarded POP$60 a share, as well as their original investment, essentially doubling their investment. The investor pays back the price borrowed to own the stock at POP$0. When you cover shorted shares of an IPO, you are awarded the difference between your original short price and the cover price.

Contests
On the first of each month a prize was awarded to the user with the greatest percentage increase in their portfolio value over the previous 30 days (minimum value POP$250000). Prizes were typically consumer electronics such as an 80 GB iPod or an LG Prada Phone.

The winner of July's prize (80GB iPod) was ScarletPimple. However, Popular Science sent the prize to TheRooster. The mistake was caught and rectified. There has been much debate about the handling of the mistake as well as the contests for the following month(s).

Types
PPX dealt with technology futures in six categories.
 Consumer Tech and Entertainment
 Military, Aviation & Space
 Extreme Science
 Energy and the Environment
 Web Trends
 Automotive Tech

Examples
Stock end dates range from a few months to several decades.

Example of a short-term stock:
 Will Transformers have the highest total box office in North America to date of all films that premiered in 2007 through Labor Day September 3, 2007?

Example of a long-term stock:
 Will a team of androids beat the human World Cup champions at a game of soccer by December 31, 2050?

Most stocks dealt with subjects featured in the Popular Science Magazine, such as SPOREQ2, a stock on whether the upcoming video game Spore would be released by the 2nd quarter of 2008. Others dealt with current events, such as DIETDRUG, a stock on whether the new FDA approved Alli, a diet supplement, would be recalled in 2007.

Closed stocks

Total Successes: 9

Total Failures:  10

Shortest Time on the Market: 5 Days (MOSPAM)

Forums
PPX also ran a forum for its users to discuss current market trends, suggest new IPO's and discuss improvements for the exchange.

Criticisms

Problems with the exchange existed from the launch of PPX. Popular Science promoted PPX as a predictions market. It was not a market at all. Players never bought and sold directly from each other at a 'market price'. A 'market price' is the price a buyer or seller will pay or sell at. Instead the PPX program fixed the price. So it was not a market at all. This is why the 'predictions' had little or no value. The magazine's June 2007 article claims that promising results from market based predictions were first seen with the 2006 congressional election. While in the end the market seemed to predict right, it was only a few hours before final results were announced that the PPX prediction was accurate. And due to the way the algorithm priced shares a player could buy a sure thing because the algorithm was not based on the market but rather a progression of its own and all you had to do was to buy shares before the algorithm caught up. The failure of PopSci to implement a predictive market did not mean the game could not be cheated.

Since the price action was based upon the games algorithm the predictive nature of a market is lost. The exchange was simply a game with no market predictive value to speak of. As the flaws of the PopSci PPX became evident to players the PPX administrators became increasingly defensive about the failure of the PPX as a predictions market. PopSci even marketed the game to schools as a way to teach about market predictions. Teachers who bought into PopSci'e claims were sadly disappointed.

Further criticisms exist around the pricing methods employed on the PPX exchange. Of the four types of actions, Buy and Short affect the price of a stock, while Sell and Cover do not. In addition there is no matching of orders, and price impacts occur after your order is processed. This led to a series of heated debates on the site forums around the viability and fairness of the PPX exchange. Critics contend the effect of this stock pricing formula has damaged the predictive nature of the market and turned it into a who can push the button the most often type of affair. Popular Science has said since the beginning that they had methods to detect players who abused this system. Initially PPX denied that it was possible to manipulate the game. It was actually quite easy and one player demonstrated how to do it. No PPX accounts have been known to be banned for cheating or manipulation but players were banned for complaining. However, the PPX administrators were no more effective in banning players than in running the 'market'. The players banned simply came back through another flaw in the website. Several accounts and/or people were hit with the anti-manipulation measures enacted by PPX administration. But only after months and months of complaints by the players. From the About section of the PPX website:

"Market manipulation will not be tolerated. PPX defines market manipulation as engaging in any activity which may artificially affect the market price of a security, or any other PPX market information. Market manipulation may include, but is not limited to: coordinated trading by different PPX accounts, unauthorized computer-assisted trading using a single or multiple PPX accounts, inappropriate disclosure of trading activity, and misrepresentation of information to the PPX community. PPX will impose heavy fines and/or trading restrictions on traders who make use of market manipulation for any purpose. Any determination as to whether market manipulation has occurred will be in the sole discretion of the PPX Administrator; all determinations are final and noncontestable.
 1st offense: a fine of 25% of Portfolio Value.
 2nd offense: a fine of 50% of Portfolio Value.
 3rd offense: the confiscation of the Account Portfolio by the PPX Administrator."

Criticism was also directed at the PPX Admins. They had shown a willingness to be very loose with their interpretations of existing rules and possibly even retroactively enforce new rules. They were also exceptionally defensive about the emerging understanding that the game was not a predictions market.

It is highly probable that all "winners" had actually been cheating and manipulating the algorithm.

Elements of cheating
Four of the top players in the game admitted to using scripts to scrape the PPX site to provide them with up-to-the-minute changes in stock prices. This allowed them to know about every up and down movement and thus rake in huge increases. At the time, there were no rules in place to outlaw such actions so the PPX Admins instead ruled that collusion occurred based purely on the fact that three accounts all had a large number of logins. As punishment, PopSci deducted 25% from their account balances. That fine, levied on the August 30, caused one player to lose the monthly contest and thus, an LG Prada phone.

The way to cheat the game was to have several accounts and first establish a position in the primary account and then buy or sell in secondary accounts to drive the price up or down. The algorithm would move the share price by a fixed amount after x number of buys or sells. The share price had nothing to do with value or what someone was willing to pay or receive for shares. The share price was mechanically set by the number of transactions and moved in fixed increments.

The PPX rules state that PPX Admins had the right to interpret their rules however they saw fit. They also state that PopSci had the final word in all disputes.

In a somewhat ironic turn, PopSci later implemented new rules outlawing trading and logging in with scripts, as well as adding a limit on prizes won by households. Both of these additions were based on recommendations from the same players PopSci chose to fine.

Other criticisms of the PPX involve it frequently crashing. At times the site operated very slowly, but it was frequently down. The crashes were explained by administration because of certain players scraping the database frequently with bots, but the problem has continued even after the bots were stopped.

References

Prediction markets
Multiplayer online games